Blockley is a village, civil parish and ecclesiastical parish in the Cotswold district of Gloucestershire, England, about  northwest of Moreton-in-Marsh. Until 1931 Blockley was an exclave of Worcestershire.

The civil and ecclesiastical parish boundaries are roughly coterminous, and include the hamlets of Draycott, Paxford and Aston Magna, the residential development at Northwick and the deserted hamlets of Upton and Upper Ditchford.

Blockley village is on Blockley Brook, a tributary of Knee Brook. Knee Brook forms the northeastern boundary of the parish and is a tributary of the River Stour.

History

Manor
In AD 855 King Burgred of Mercia granted a monastery at Blockley to Ealhhun, Bishop of Worcester for the price of 300 solidi. In 1086 the Domesday Book recorded that the Bishop of Worcester held an estate of 38 hides at Blockley. The Bishops of Worcester retained the estate until 1648, during the English Civil War, when the Parliamentary Trustees sold it. After the restoration of the English monarchy the estate was restored to the Bishop of Worcester, whose successors held the manor until at least 1781.

Churches

The Church of England parish church of St. Peter and St. Paul is late Norman, built in about 1180. The ecclesiastical parish now forms part of the Vale and Cotswold Edge team of Church of England churches, with the Team Vicar remaining responsible for Blockley and its outlying villages of Paxford, Draycott and Aston Magna, as well as the parish of Bourton-on-the-Hill.

The church is used as St Mary's Roman Catholic church in the Father Brown television series and the vicarage as the presbytery, Father Brown's residence.

The Baptist Chapel was built in 1835.

Economic and social history
In 1715 the Vicar, the Rev. Dr. Erasmus Saunders, had a new school built for the parish. Blockley still has a Church of England primary school.

Much of the parish was farmed under an open field system until 1772, when an Act of Parliament provided for the enclosure of the remaining common lands.

The Oxford, Worcester and Wolverhampton Railway, built between 1845 and 1851, passes through the parish. British Railways closed Blockley railway station in 1966 but the railway remains open as part of the Cotswold Line.

Blockley is home to Watsonian Squire, the largest UK manufacturer of sidecars and trailers for motorbikes. It has been based in the village since 1984.

Governance
An electoral ward in the same name exists. This ward has the same area and population as the civil parish.

Amenities

Blockley has two public houses. The Crown Inn and Hotel is a former coaching inn. The Great Western Arms belongs to the Hook Norton Brewery.

Blockley Sports & Social Club is the local sports club which has Hockey, Cricket and Football sections. The post office closed in 2007. In May 2008, under a co-operative agreement, the village residents opened a new local not for profit store that is a grocer, newsagent, post office, off-licence and café.

References

Sources

External links

Villages in Gloucestershire
Cotswold District
Cotswolds